"Sunshine" is a song released by The Archies in 1970, taken from their fourth studio album Sunshine.  The song was written by Jeff Barry and Bobby Bloom.  It peaked at number 57 on the Billboard Hot 100 chart. It is their last Hot 100 hit to date, although their next single "Together We Two" would peak at number 122 on the Bubbling Under Hot 100 chart. "Sunshine"  was first issued on Kirshner Records and was later reissued on the RCA Records label.

Charts

References

The Archies songs
1970 songs
1970 singles
Songs written by Jeff Barry
Songs written by Bobby Bloom